Point Run is a  long 1st order tributary to Little Wheeling Creek in Ohio County, West Virginia.

Course 
Point Run rises about 0.5 miles southeast of Point Mills, West Virginia, in Ohio County and then flows west to join Little Wheeling Creek at Roneys Point.

Watershed 
Point Run drains  of area, receives about 41.0 in/year of precipitation, has a wetness index of 284.29, and is about 74% forested.

See also 
 List of rivers of West Virginia

References 

Rivers of Ohio County, West Virginia
Rivers of West Virginia